Schizolaena is a genus of trees and shrubs in the family Sarcolaenaceae. They are endemic to Madagascar.

Species 
The genus includes the following species:
 Schizolaena capuronii  
 Schizolaena cauliflora  
 Schizolaena cavacoana  
 Schizolaena charlotteae  
 Schizolaena elongata  
 Schizolaena exinvolucrata  
 Schizolaena gereaui  
 Schizolaena hystrix  
 Schizolaena isaloensis  
 Schizolaena manomboensis  
 Schizolaena masoalensis  
 Schizolaena microphylla  
 Schizolaena milleri  
 Schizolaena noronhae  
 Schizolaena parviflora  
 Schizolaena parvipetala 
 Schizolaena pectinata  
 Schizolaena raymondii  
 Schizolaena rosea  
 Schizolaena tampoketsana  
 Schizolaena turkii  
 Schizolaena viscosa

References

 
Malvales genera